The Pictou County Crushers (also commonly known as Weeks Jr. A Crushers due to a sponsorship deal with Weeks Construction) are a Canadian junior ice hockey team based in New Glasgow, Nova Scotia.  They are in the Maritime Junior Hockey League's Eastlink South Division along with five other Nova Scotia clubs. The Crushers play their home games at the Pictou County Wellness Centre.

History
The Crushers originated in Halifax. The franchise, under various names in Nova Scotia's capital city, holds the MHL (formerly the MJAHL) record for most championships with 10. As the Halifax Oland Exports, they captured the 2002 Royal Bank Cup on home ice. Due to financial reasons, the team's name was changed to Halifax Team Pepsi for the 2003-2004 campaign.

In the spring of 2004, the Weeks Hockey Organization bought the club, moved it to New Glasgow and renamed it the Pictou County Weeks Crushers. The team's name and logo are tied to its founding sponsor, Weeks Construction.

After struggling to attract fans in Halifax's crowded hockey market, the Crushers soared up the attendance ladder in New Glasgow and are now one of the league's top draws at the gate.

The Crushers hosted the 2005 MJAHL All-Star Game and the 2006 MJAHL Entry Draft.

In April 2008, the Crushers were the Fred Page Cup host team. They shocked everyone as the underdogs defeated the defending FPC champion Pembroke Lumber Kings 4-1 in the championship game. With the victory, the Crushers advanced to their first ever Royal Bank Cup, in Cornwall, Ontario. They went 1-4 at the RBC, losing the semifinal game 3-0 to the Camrose Kodiaks.

In November 2012, the Crushers moved out of their former home John Brother MacDonald Stadium that they used from 2004 to 2012 and into the new Pictou County Wellness Center.

The Crushers won their first Kent cup in 2016 defeating the Dieppe Commandos in the final, they have also come close back to back years (2010,2011)
by making it to the finals but they lost both times. In 2010 they lost to the Woodstock Slammers 4-1 and, in 2011 they lost to the Summerside Western Capitals 4-0.

Season-by-season record

Fred Page Cup
Eastern Canada Championships
MHL - QAAAJHL - CCHL - Host
Round robin play with 2nd vs 3rd in semi-final to advance against 1st in the finals.

Notable alumni
 Derrick Walser (NHL, KHL, NLA, DEL)

See also
List of ice hockey teams in Nova Scotia

References

External links
Official Crushers Website
Official MHL Website

Ice hockey teams in Nova Scotia
Maritime Junior Hockey League teams
New Glasgow, Nova Scotia
1967 establishments in Nova Scotia
Ice hockey clubs established in 1967